Dušan "Duško" Milinković (born 2 December 1960) is a former Serbian footballer. He played in the Yugoslav football team in the summer 1988 Olympic Games. Locally, he was popularly known as Sulja.

His son Marko Milinković is also a professional footballer.

Honours
Rad
1 time Yugoslav First League top-scorer: 1987-88

References
 
 
 
 
 

Living people
1960 births
Sportspeople from Čačak
Serbian footballers
Yugoslav footballers
Olympic footballers of Yugoslavia
Footballers at the 1988 Summer Olympics
FK Borac Čačak players
FK Rad players
Yugoslav First League players
CA Osasuna players
La Liga players
Expatriate footballers in Spain
Samsunspor footballers
Karşıyaka S.K. footballers
Süper Lig players
Expatriate footballers in Turkey
Serbian expatriate footballers
Association football forwards